Frank Thomas, born Franc Georges Fernand Combès, (15 May 1936 – 20 January 2017) was a French songwriter. Over the course of his career, he wrote songs for Claude François, Sylvie Vartan, Michel Polnareff, Gilbert Bécaud, Joe Dassin and Gérard Berliner.

References

1936 births
2017 deaths
French songwriters
Male songwriters